Elections to Trafford Council were held on Thursday, 6 May 1976. One third of the council was up for election, with each successful candidate to serve a four-year term of office, expiring in 1980. The Conservative Party retained overall control of the council.

After the election, the composition of the council was as follows:

Ward results

References

1976 English local elections
1976
1970s in Greater Manchester
May 1976 events in the United Kingdom